"Starry Eyed" is a Michael Holliday song that became the UK No. 1 single on 29 January 1960. It was written by Earl Shuman and Mort Garson and produced by Norrie Paramor. Entering the charts dated 1 January 1960, it spent 12 weeks there altogether. It was the first UK No. 1 single of the 1960s. The previous year the song was a follow-up single for American singer Gary Stites, where it was a minor success with US audiences.

References

1960 singles
UK Singles Chart number-one singles
Songs written by Mort Garson
Songs with lyrics by Earl Shuman
Song recordings produced by Norrie Paramor
1960 songs
Columbia Graphophone Company singles